Akrum Wadley (born March 13, 1995) is a former American football running back. He was signed by the Tennessee Titans as an undrafted free agent in 2018. He played college football at Iowa.

Early years
Akrum was born on March 13, 1995, in Newark, New Jersey to Sheronda Phelps and John Wadley. Akrum is one of five sons. Wadley attended Weequahic High School in Newark, New Jersey. He committed to the University of Iowa to play college football.

College career
Wadley played at Iowa from 2014 to 2017. In his final collegiate game, he was named the MVP of the 2017 Pinstripe Bowl after rushing for 88 yards with a touchdown. During his career, he rushed for 2,872 yards over 536 carries with 28 touchdowns. While at Iowa, Wadley was a communications major

Statistics

Professional career

Tennessee Titans
Wadley signed with the Tennessee Titans as an undrafted free agent on May 11, 2018. He was waived on September 1, 2018.

Atlanta Legends
In 2019, he signed with the Atlanta Legends of the Alliance of American Football. He was placed on injured reserve on March 6, 2019. The league ceased operations in April 2019.

Houston Roughnecks
In October 2019, Wadley was picked by the Houston Roughnecks during the 2020 XFL Draft. He was waived on January 5, 2020.

Personal life
In a report published on June 29, 2020, Wadley made allegations against Iowa head coach Kirk Ferentz, offensive coordinator Brian Ferentz, and former strength and conditioning coach Chris Doyle. The allegations included mistreatment and racial disparities.

References

External links
Iowa Hawkeyes bio

1995 births
Living people
Players of American football from Newark, New Jersey
American football running backs
Iowa Hawkeyes football players
Tennessee Titans players
Atlanta Legends players
Houston Roughnecks players
Weequahic High School alumni